Marcel Bourbonnais (27 February 1918  14 October 1996) was a Canadian politician, draftsman, engineer, foreman and technician. He was elected to the House of Commons of Canada in 1958 as a Member of the Progressive Conservative Party to represent the riding of Vaudreuil—Soulanges. He was re-elected in 1962 and defeated in the elections of 1957, 1963 and 1965.

External links
 

1918 births
1996 deaths
Members of the House of Commons of Canada from Quebec
Place of death missing
Politicians from Quebec City
Progressive Conservative Party of Canada MPs